Nils Ivar Edvard Dahlgren (2 April 1891 – 30 October 1948) was a Swedish stage and film actor.  He acted on stage for around twenty years before making his film debut in 1934. He generally played small, supporting parts on screen but played a leading role as a missionary in the 1948 drama I Am with You shortly before his death.

Selected filmography
 Simon of Backabo (1934)
 The Marriage Game (1935)
 The Wedding Trip (1936)
 Thunder and Lightning (1938)
 Dollar (1938)
 One, But a Lion! (1940)
 Kiss Her! (1940)
 Life Goes On (1941)
 Home from Babylon (1941)
 General von Döbeln (1942)
 There's a Fire Burning (1943)
 I Killed (1943)
 The Old Clock at Ronneberga (1944)
 Torment (1944)
 The Journey Away (1945)
 His Majesty Must Wait (1945)
 Kristin Commands (1946)
 Incorrigible (1946)
 Each Heart Has Its Own Story (1948)
 Port of Call (1948)
 I Am with You (1948)

References

Bibliography
 Paietta, Ann C.. Saints, Clergy and Other Religious Figures on Film and Television, 1895–2003. McFarland, 2005.
 Steene, Birgitta. Ingmar Bergman: A Reference Guide. Amsterdam University Press, 2005.

External links

1891 births
1948 deaths
Swedish male film actors
Swedish male stage actors
People from Kalmar
20th-century Swedish male actors